Events from the year 1430 in France

Incumbents
 Monarch – Charles VII

Events
 7 January – Philip the Good, Duke of Burgundy, marries Isabella of Portugal. 
 10 January – Philip the Good founds the Order of the Golden Fleece.
 14 May – The French first attempt to relieve the siege of Compiègne during the Hundred Years War
 23 May  – Joan of Arc is captured by the Burgundians, while leading an army to relieve Compiègne.

Births
 23 March – Margaret of Anjou, future Queen of England (died 1482)

Deaths
 26 June – Louis I, Duke of Bar, bishop (born 1370)
 Alain Chartier, writer (born 1385)

References

1430s in France